Bryocaulon is a genus of lichenized fungi in the family Parmeliaceae. The genus has a widespread distribution in north temperate regions, and contains three species. The genus was circumscribed by Swedish lichenologist Ingvar Kärnefelt in 1986.

See also
List of Parmeliaceae genera

References

Parmeliaceae
Lichen genera
Lecanorales genera
Taxa described in 1986